Tamari Chalaganidze (born 14 October 1995) is a Georgian tennis player. She made her WTA debut at the 2013 Baku Cup.
She has 1 Junior ITF Title Astana, Kazakhstan 2010

References 

1995 births
Living people
Female tennis players from Georgia (country)